Tripoli Tower (Arabic:برج طرابلس) (Formerly Al Fateh Tower برج الفاتح) is a tower and skyscraper in Tripoli, Libya. It is located in city center of Tripoli, near central business district. The building was opened in 2003. The tower houses retail outlets, serviced apartments and as well as a boutique hotel with an Oilman’s club. There are four levels of basement car parking.

External links
 Al Fateh Tower in the Emporis database

Buildings and structures in Tripoli, Libya
Residential buildings completed in 2003
Skyscrapers in Africa